Initials B.B is a 1968 studio album by Serge Gainsbourg. It was originally released by Philips Records.

Critical reception

In 2010, the French edition of Rolling Stone named it the 14th greatest French rock album. In 2017, Pitchfork placed it at number 117 on the "200 Best Albums of the 1960s" list. In 2019, Happy Mag named it "racy and effortlessly cool."

Track listing 

Notes
"Docteur Jekyll et Monsieur Hyde", "Shu Ba Du Ba Loo Ba", "Qui est in qui est out" and "Marilu" recorded at Fontana Studios, London in December 1965. Originally released on EP Qui Est, In Qui Est, Out released in January 1966.
"Comic Strip", "Torrey Canyon" and "Hold Up" recorded at Chappell Studios, London in June 1967. Originally released on EP Mr. Gainsbourg released on July 8, 1967.
"Bonnie and Clyde" recorded at Hoche Studios, Paris on December 11 and 12, 1967. Originally released on EP Bonnie and Clyde released on January 2, 1968.
"Initials B.B.", "Bloody Jack", "Ford Mustang" and "Black and White" recorded at Chappell Studios, London in May 1968. Originally released on EP Initials BB released in May 1968.

Personnel
Credits adapted from liner notes.

 Serge Gainsbourg – vocals
 Brigitte Bardot – vocals (8)
 Arthur Greenslade and his Orchestra – arrangement, orchestral direction (1, 3, 4, 6, 7, 9, 10, 12)
 David Whitaker – arrangement, orchestral direction (2, 5, 11)
 Michel Colombier and his Orchestra – arrangement, orchestral direction (8)
 Claude Dejacques – artistic production
 André Decamp - cover illustration

Charts

References

External links
 
 

1968 albums
Serge Gainsbourg albums
Philips Records albums
French-language albums
Albums conducted by Arthur Greenslade
Albums arranged by Arthur Greenslade
Cultural depictions of Brigitte Bardot